HMS Gloucester was a Batch 3 Type 42 destroyer of the Royal Navy, built by Vosper Thorneycroft at Woolston, Southampton and launched on 2 November 1982 by The Duchess of Gloucester. Gloucester was one of the modified last four of the class to be built, having a lengthened hull design giving better seakeeping qualities, greater endurance and an external 'strake' to counter longitudinal cracking, seen on earlier ships of the type. The flight deck recognition letters worn by Gloucester were GC, and her international callsign was GBBF.

History
In January 1987 Gloucester sailed for her first deployment; Armilla patrol, protecting civilian ships transiting the Strait of Hormuz. Port visits included Djibouti City; Sharjah; Manama; Karachi; Mombasa and Naples, returning to her homeport in June 1987.

In January 1988 the ship again deployed to the Gulf for an Armilla patrol. Port visits this time included Bahrain; Dubai; Mombasa and Rhodes. Further visits were planned but these were curtailed due to increasing tensions in the region.

In April 1989 Gloucester deployed westbound to perform duties as West Indies Guard Ship.  Port visits included Nassau, Bahamas; Anguilla; Antigua; British Virgin Islands; Kingston, Jamaica; Acapulco; Long Beach, California; San Francisco and West Palm Beach.

First Gulf War
Gloucester served in the Persian Gulf War in 1991 under the command of Commander (later Rear Admiral) Philip Wilcocks where her most notable action was to shoot down an Iraqi Silkworm missile with Sea Dart missiles.  The  Iraqi missile had targeted the US battleship  and the intercept was the first validated, successful missile-versus-missile strike of its kind.

After a missile warning, both the USS Missouri and  fired flares and chaff to decoy the missile.  Gloucester, drawing from the Royal Navy's experience during the Falklands War, when Exocet missiles re-acquired the merchant ship Atlantic Conveyor after decoys were deployed, did not activate her own decoys. The Royal Navy considered missiles like the Silkworm as targets to be shot down and firing chaff made that action difficult. Gloucester initiated a hard turn, firing two Sea Darts "over her starboard shoulder".  The entire engagement, from detection to destruction, took just 89 seconds.  The interception range was between 2¾ Nautical miles to 4 Nautical miles away from Gloucester, and 4 Nautical miles to 7 Nautical miles away from USS Missouri. USS Jarrett‘s history listed the missile's altitude at 375 feet while witnesses aboard HMS London estimated between 680 to 1,000 feet.

Later, Missouri‘s 16-inch guns destroyed the Iraqi missile battery.

Gloucester avoided  two naval mines, conducted boardings and the ship's Lynx helicopter destroyed several Iraqi warships including three fast attack craft, a T43 minelayer, and a Polnocny-class landing ship, with Sea Skua missiles.  She spent the longest period in the combat area of any coalition warship and her captain (Commander Philip Wilcocks) and flight commander (Lt Cdr David Livingstone) were awarded the Distinguished Service Cross with the operations officer and flight observer both mentioned in Despatches. After this service Gloucester was rebranded "The Fighting G", after the earlier HMS Gloucester, a Town-class cruiser, sunk by German aircraft, in May 1941.

Later Deployments
In 1997, Gloucester took part in Ocean Wave 97. Ocean Wave lasted 8 months, which saw her visit countries including Australia, New Zealand, Singapore and the UAE as well as taking part in the Five Power Defence Arrangements Exercise Flying Fish. Part of the role of the Task Force was to oversee the peaceful handover of Hong Kong to the Chinese.

During the 2006 Israel-Lebanon conflict, Gloucester was the first Royal Navy vessel to evacuate British nationals from Beirut, berthing on 18 July 2006. She made three trips taking evacuees to Cyprus, and was the last Royal Navy ship to leave Beirut. She underwent a £6 million refit at Rosyth Dockyard in Fife, Scotland, in 2007. On the morning of 26 August 2010 she intercepted the yacht Tortuga, smuggling £4 million of cocaine, during Gloucesters voyage out to the Falkland Islands, where she was deployed from August 2010 to early 2011. On 20 September 2010 the government of Uruguay denied Gloucester access to Montevideo as a result of the Falkland Islands sovereignty dispute.

In May 2011, she took part in Exercise Saxon Warrior. This was the final deployment for Gloucester prior to its decommissioning.

Decommissioning
Gloucester returned to HMNB Portsmouth for the final time on 24 May 2011 and was decommissioned on 30 June 2011, under the command of her last captain, Commander David George.  On 22 September 2015 she left Portsmouth harbour under tow, bound for a breaker's yard in Turkey.  During her service she sailed  787,928 miles (1,268,047 km)

On decommissioning, Commander David George, said:

"I cannot express how proud I am of the ship. It was a very emotional final entry for the very best of ships, but she is 29 years old, and with more than 750,000 miles [1.2m kilometres] under her belt. There are more capable Type 45 destroyers now taking the stage, and Gloucester’s time has come to bow out with dignity."

Affiliations
The ship retains links with the Royal Gloucestershire, Berkshire and Wiltshire Regiment and the City of Gloucester. The ship's crest features a horseshoe, part of the city's Tudor arms.

 The Rifles
 City of Gloucester
 Worshipful Company of Grocers
 Gloucester R.F.C.
 2nd Durrington Sea Scout Group
 Gloucester Royal Naval Association
 Milton Abbey Combined Cadet Force (CCF)

Gallery

References

External links

 Royal Navy Website: HMS Gloucester (D96)

 

Cold War destroyers of the United Kingdom
History of Gloucester
Military history of Gloucestershire
1982 ships
Type 42 destroyers of the Royal Navy
Gulf War ships of the United Kingdom